Sarn Badrig, also spelled Sarn Padrig (Welsh for 'St. Patrick's causeway'), is one of several more or less parallel shingle reefs extending under the sea in Cardigan Bay on the west coast of Wales. The causeway is made of glacial deposits left by receding ice sheets at the end of the last ice age.

Sarn Badrig is the longest and most northerly of these, and extends south-westwards under the sea from Mochras Point, near Harlech, parallel to the Llŷn Peninsula for a length of about 20 km, and can be seen at low tide. It is a hazard to shipping.

A neighbouring causeway is that of Sarn y Bwch, which is close to Tywyn.

Another example can be found at Sarn Gynfelyn, which is north of Aberystwyth.

In Welsh legend it is one of the dykes which protected the drowned realm of Cantre'r Gwaelod.

Points of interest

External links

Cantre'r Gwaelod (The Lowland Hundred)
Sarn Badrig - St. Patrick's Causeway
www.geograph.co.uk : photos of Sarn Badrig

Reefs of Gwynedd
Cardigan Bay
Reefs of the Atlantic Ocean